Sisinnius I (died December 24, 427) was the Archbishop of Constantinople from 426 to 427.

Before the election, Sisinnius was priest in the area of Elaea (modern-day Cihangir) and had become known for his virtues and piety, as well as for acts of charity.

After the death of Archbishop Atticus of Constantinople, the patriarch's throne was vacant for some time, as there was controversy about the choice of a successor. According to the dominant view, this period was about four months and ended with the election of Sisinnius on February 426.

For the consecration and its establishment, the Emperor Theodosius II convened a meeting chaired by the Theodotus of Antioch.

In the days of the patriarch was in recession the question of the attitude of the followers of John Chrysostom, which occurred when he was exiled.

References 

427 deaths
5th-century Archbishops of Constantinople
Year of birth unknown